The 1852 Grand National was the 14th renewal of the Grand National horse race that took place at Aintree near Liverpool, England, on 3 March 1852.
The winning jockey, Alec Goodman, later rode the 1866 winner.

Course changes
There was some slight modification to the water jump, which measured at 13 feet 6 inches this year while the hedge out of Proceed's Lane [modern day Melling Road at Anchor Bridge Crossing] was removed, leaving a small bank out of the lane to negotiate.

Leading Contenders
La Gazza Ladra was the choice of the racegoers on the day, backing her from 12/1 in to 6/1 favourite, due most notably to her being easily the fastest horse in the race. Racing journalist, Whalebone remarked that she could surely not be beaten if first over the final flight. With J Neale up, she survived a collision at the First Beecher's and was still well in contention crossing Proceed's Lane [known today at Anchor Bridge] but her stamina let her down, rendering her finishing pace worthless. She was beaten coming back onto the racecourse and finished fifth.

Abd El Kader was aiming to complete a treble of victories but his doubters felt he had been harshly treated by the handicapper. Despite that, and jockey, Denny Wynne putting up a lb over, the public backed him down to 9/1 on the course. The doubters were proved correct when Abd El Kader began to struggle at the start of the second circuit, pulling up before reaching Beecher's for the second time.

Chieftain was backed down from 20/1 to 12/1 at Tattersalls during February and was tipped to win by the Racing Correspondent of the Liverpool Mail in the days before the race. His owner/rider, Harrison set out to stake a pillar to post victory and stayed around five lengths clear for most of the race until beginning to tire on turning for home. Harrison's bold bid for victory fell just three lengths short in fourth place.

Cogia, Maria Day, Miss Mowbray, Warner and Victress were all well supported for weeks leading up to the race with Tattersalls placing Victress as the long time ante post favourite. However, support for the mare faded on the day and she was knocked out of the race after a collision with La Gazza Ladra at the first Beecher's. Maria Day had finished second the previous year but was rumoured to be out of sorts going into the race. A bad first fence blunder, which resulted in Frisby pulling the mare up seemed to support that theory. Cogia also made a poor effort and was already struggling when falling at Becher's the first time while Warner also found the pace too hot, completing in his own time in sixth. Miss Mowbray was well supported at tattersalls from the moment the weights were published in January and she is quoted at various prices from 16s to 12s in many news articles in the days leading up to the race, where she was also regularly tipped as a potential winner. However, at some point in the decades after her victory, a notion developed that she was an unquoted outsider, which has been repeated in various publications throughout the 20th Century.

Finishing Order

Non-finishers

Contemporary reports regarding starting prices are often in conflict as different papers took their prices from differing sources. The only dedicated sporting newspaper to cover the race was Bell's London Life. The prices listed here are taken from their returns and report. Those not listed in the betting are referred to as Not Quoted. Bookmakers would have listed these on the day as 'any price these others' meaning they would take any reasonable price requested by the backer. This would probably have been between 100 and 250/1.

There were two competitors named Bedford. The press distinguished between them by their age.

References

 1852
Grand National
Grand National
19th century in Lancashire
March 1852 sports events